Farida Rahmeh (born 22 September 1953) is a Lebanese alpine skier. She competed at the 1976 Winter Olympics and the 1980 Winter Olympics.

References

1953 births
Living people
Lebanese female alpine skiers
Olympic alpine skiers of Lebanon
Alpine skiers at the 1976 Winter Olympics
Alpine skiers at the 1980 Winter Olympics
Place of birth missing (living people)